Charles John Hurley (born 4 October 1936) is an Irish former footballer who played mainly in the Center Back  position. Hurley is best known for his long career at Sunderland, where he was named the Black Cats' "Player of the Century" by their fans on the occasion of the club's centenary in 1979. Nicknamed 'King,’ Hurley was a defender for both Sunderland and the Republic of Ireland. He ended his playing career at Bolton Wanderers and was later manager of Reading.

Early life

He later survived The Blitz, in which one of his best friends was killed, and as a teenager worked as an apprentice toolmaker. His first offer of a football contract was from West Ham but he turned it down as he could earn more for his family by continuing with his apprenticeship. However, at the age of sixteen he did eventually accept a contract offer from Millwall.

Career

Millwall

Hurley began his football career at Millwall in 1953, making his debut at the age of seventeen in a 2–2 draw away to Torquay United on 30 January 1954. He went on to make 16 league appearances in the season. He followed this up with 38 league games in 1954–55 and also played three FA Cup ties. At the start of 1955–56, he was considered good enough to represent London in the first English team to play in a European competition. London beat t Frankfurt 3–2 at Wembley in the Fairs Cup and the headline in the Daily Mail was HURLEY HOLDS . He was thus selected to play for the Republic of Ireland at aged 20 but a cruciate knee ligament injury, whilst representing the army side on his national service, ended any such plans and put Hurleys' career into doubt. Rehabilitation involved rest and then twelve to eighteen hours work a day for six weeks. On his recovery, Hurley swiftly returned to  action but for the rest of his career the Irishman had to be particularly careful when making a sliding tackle and required constant treatment on his left knee.

On Sunday 19 May 1957 Hurley made his long-awaited Irish debut against England in Dublin. The two sides had just met at Wembley and England had triumphed 5–1 with Manchester United's Tommy Taylor scoring three times. Hurley was selected to mark Taylor and was set for a baptism of fire. England needed just a point to qualify for a place in the following summer's world cup finals in Sweden, whereas if Ireland were victorious it would set things up for a third and winners take all match against the sides. Only a last-minute John Atyeo equaliser prevented Ireland from deservedly winning a game in which Hurley overshadowed Taylor, causing the Daily Mirror to comment: "it was the Irish who produced the new great world-class footballer in centre back Charlie Hurley. Half the clubs in the First Division will soon be knocking on Millwall's door offering £25,000 for him".

By the start of the following season it was clear that Millwall had to cash in on their prize asset and in early October he was sold to Sunderland for a fee of £18,000. He was not yet 21 and despite having played for such a short time the fans of Millwall voted him their 'best ever player' in the Millwall fanzine The Lion Roars prior to the Dockers Day at the New Den in 2007.

Hurley admitted he had no idea where Sunderland was but was to go on and become a big favourite on Wearside.

(All sources in this section from Charlie Hurley – "The greatest centre half the world has ever seen" by Mark Metcalf, published in 2008 by Sportsbooks)

Sunderland

On 26 September 1957, Charlie Hurley arrived at Roker Park to begin a career that would span 12 seasons and 402 appearances.

Hurley's Sunderland career had a disastrous start; a 7–0 rout by Blackpool, coupled with him scoring an own goal on his debut, which was quickly followed by a 6–0 defeat by Burnley. Hurley had been unfortunate enough to have competed against centre forwards who would later go on to represent England. In Ray Charnley and Ray Pointer, Blackpool and Burnley had strikers of the highest quality.  Matters improved and eventually promotion was achieved in the 1963/64 season after two campaigns which had seen Sunderland miss out on top flight football due to consecutive last day failures against Swansea Town and Chelsea.

Curiously, for a man who was indelibly linked with powerful headed goals, it took 124 league and cup appearances for Sunderland before he broke his scoring duck. A 1–1 Boxing Day draw in 1960 against Sheffield United was the first of 43.

Whilst the 1963/64 season was special for Sunderland AFC, resulting in promotion, it was also personally highly satisfactory for Hurley, who came second to Bobby Moore in voting for FWA Footballer of the Year.

In the late sixties, alongside Jimmy Montgomery, Cecil Irwin, Len Ashurst, Martin Harvey and Jim McNab, Hurley formed one of the most notable and most settled back fives in Sunderland's history.

Alan Brown's departure from Roker Park, to take over at Sheffield Wednesday saw first George Hardwick and then Scotsman Ian McColl take over. During one match at Old Trafford in November 1966, first Hurley, and then Northern Ireland defender John Parke went in goal, as Montgomery had to leave the game because of an injury sustained in the first half.

Hurley's last goal for Sunderland came against Arsenal in April 1968, typically a header. His last appearance in a red and white shirt was at Turf Moor, Burnley in April 1969.

Hurley's greatest match was arguably the FA Cup 5th round victory at Carrow Road in February 1961, when he scored the only goal to dump Norwich City out of the competition. Sunderland would then go on to succumb to a Danny Blanchflower-inspired Spurs side, who became double winners for the first time in the 20th century.

In a poll Sunderland fans voted him player of the century.

Bolton Wanderers
On 2 June 1969, Charlie moved to Bolton Wanderers on a free transfer. He spent three years at Burnden Park and was a well-liked figure in the heart of the defence, so much so that he was given the opportunity to manage the club upon the departure of Jimmy Meadows only to reluctantly turn the chance down because his wife missed living in the South of England.

Managerial career

From 1972 to 1977 Charlie managed Reading F.C., then based at Elm Park. One of his greatest moments was in the 4th round of the F.A. Cup in February 1972, when he guided Reading, then a 4th division outfit to a 4th-round meeting with the great double-winning Arsenal side. Over 20,000 people packed into Elm Park, and Charlie's charges narrowly lost 2–1 to a side containing George Graham, Charlie George, Geordie Armstrong, Bob Wilson, Frank McLintock and other international-class players. Reading finished the season in sixteenth place in Division 4. During the 1972–73 season Hurley enjoyed an emotional 'home coming' when took his side to face Sunderland at Roker Park in the fourth round of the FA Cup. After a 1–1 draw Sunderland won the replay 3–1. The following spring the Reading manager took a gamble by purchasing Robin Friday from non-league Hayes F.C. Friday should have been playing in the top flight, but his temperament, drinking and smoking were a major handicap. Hurley was the only man to ever get the best out of Friday and in 1975–76 Reading won promotion, with Friday often playing brilliantly. The star of the Reading side was determined to move on, and Hurley allowed him to move to Cardiff for £30,000 before the start of the season, where he faded away and was eventually lost to the game. He died of a heart attack at just 38. Reading struggled without their best player, and, as they plummeted back to the lower flight, Hurley quit on 26 February 1977.

References 

Charlie Hurley – "the greatest centre half the world has ever seen" by Mark Metcalf, published by Sportsbooks in 2008.

External links
Charlie Hurley, Post War English & Scottish Football League A – Z Player's Transfer Database

1936 births
Living people
Sportspeople from Cork (city)
Association football defenders
Republic of Ireland association footballers
Republic of Ireland international footballers
Millwall F.C. players
Sunderland A.F.C. players
Bolton Wanderers F.C. players
English Football League players
Republic of Ireland football managers
Republic of Ireland national football team managers
Reading F.C. managers
London XI players